Montesegale is a comune (municipality) in the Province of Pavia in the Italian region Lombardy, located about 60 km south of Milan and about 30 km south of Pavia.

Montesegale borders the following municipalities: Borgo Priolo, Fortunago, Godiasco, Ponte Nizza, Rocca Susella, Val di Nizza.

Demographic evolution 
The bars indicate the number of  residents in a given year.

Twin towns
Montesegale is twinned with:

  Valbelle, France, since 1999

References

Cities and towns in Lombardy